FC RUOR Minsk was a Belarusian football club based in Minsk.

History
RUOR Minsk was a student team representing Republican School of Olympic Reserve (Respublikansoye Uchilishe Olimpiyskogo Reserva). From 1995 till 1997 the club acted as reserve/feeder team for MPKC Mozyr and played under names MPKC-2 (1995) and MPKC-96 (1996–1997). In 1998 the partnership with MPKC ended and the team continued playing under their original name RUOR Minsk. Since 2004 the team withdrew from Belarusian Second League and continued playing at youth level only.

Several notable RUOR graduates (Artem Kontsevoy, Leonid Kovel, Dmitry Lentsevich, Yuri Zhevnov, Alyaksandr Martynovich, Vitali Kutuzov, Anton Putsila) went on to represent Belarus national football team later in their careers.

External links 
Profile at teams.by 
RGUOR information at Ministry of Sports and Tourism website 

RUOR
RUOR
1995 establishments in Belarus
Association football clubs established in 1995